Proeulia cneca is a species of moth of the family Tortricidae. It is found in Chile.

The length of the forewings is about 11 mm. The forewings are ochreous with a slight silvery shine and some areas covered with yellow scales. The hindwings are white.

References

Moths described in 1964
Proeulia
Endemic fauna of Chile